Minuscule 272 (in the Gregory-Aland numbering), ε 1182 (Soden), is a Greek minuscule manuscript of the New Testament, on parchment. Palaeographically it has been assigned to the 11th century. 
It has marginalia.

Description 

The codex contains the text of the four Gospels on 218 parchment leaves. The text is written in one column per page, in 21 lines per page.

There is also a division according to the Ammonian Sections, with references to the Eusebian Canons (mostly omitted).

Text 

The Greek text of the codex is a representative of the Byzantine text-type. Hermann von Soden classified it to the textual family K1. Aland placed it in Category V. According to the Claremont Profile Method in Luke 1 and Luke 20 it belongs to the textual family Kx. It creates textual pair with 419

Passage of Matthew 16:2b–3 (signs of the times) is excluded.

History 

The manuscript once belonged to Melchisedek Thevenot († 1692), then it was held at the Bibliothèque nationale de France (Gr. 76). Thomas Rodd († 1822), librarian, purchased it for the British Museum.

The manuscripts was added to the list of New Testament manuscripts by Scholz (1794–1852).
C. R. Gregory saw the manuscript in 1883.

The manuscript is currently housed at the British Library (Add MS 15581) in London.

See also 

 List of New Testament minuscules
 Biblical manuscript
 Textual criticism

References

Further reading 

 

Greek New Testament minuscules
11th-century biblical manuscripts
British Library additional manuscripts